Bhagirathi Gamang  was an Indian politician. He was elected to the Lok Sabha lower house of the Parliament of India from Koraput, Odisha  as a member of the Indian National Congress.

He died in 2013.

References

Lok Sabha members from Odisha
India MPs 1971–1977
Indian National Congress politicians from Odisha